Anastasia Lapsui (born 1944) is a Soviet-born Nenets film director, screenwriter, and radio journalist who has lived in Finland since 1993. Lapsui, together with Markku Lehmuskallio, directed "Seven Songs from the Tundra," the first narrative film in the Nenets language. Lapsui has won numerous honors, including the Jussi Award for Best Film, and the Grand Prize at the Créteil International Women's Film Festival.

Biography
Anastasia Lapsui was born to a nomadic family in Nida, Yamalo-Nenets Autonomous Okrug, northwest of Siberia, in 1944. She graduated from Ural State University in Sverdlovsk Oblast. Early in her career, she was a radio reporter in the city of Salekhard, and also wrote screenplays. Together with her spouse, Markku Lehmuskallio, they have directed more than 10 films about the Nenets, the Sami, and other indigenous peoples from around the world. Of the movie Matkalla (On the Way), completed in 2007, Lapsui says:— 
"This movie has a special meaning to me. In it, I present my own view of the Nenets religion and the afterlife."

Awards
 2000, Best Film (Nordic), Amanda Award
 2000, Grand Prize, Créteil International Women's Film Festival
 2001, Best Film, Jussi Awards
 2005, Best International Feature, Birds Eye View Award
 2009, Suomi-palkinto (Finland Award)
 2014, Taiteilijaeläke (Artist pension)

Filmography 
 1993, Poron hahmossa pitkin taivaankaarta (editing, music, narrator, recording)
 1994, Kadotettu paratiisi (planning, Nenets / Finnish translations, editing, recording)
 1995, Jäähyväisten kronikka (editing)
 1997, Anna (directing, manuscript)
 1998, The Sacrifice: A Film About a Forest (directing, planning, recording, editing)
 1999, Seven Songs from the Tundra (directing, costume, cut, staging, manuscript)
 2001, Shepherd (directing, manuscript)
 2002, Mothers of Life (directing, editing, voice, songs)
 2003, A Bride of the Seventh Heaven (directing, costume, manuscript)
 2004, Fata Morgana (directing, editing, recording, manuscript)
 2006, The Sami (guidance, editing)
 2007, Matkalla (directing, screenplay, actor)
 2008, Travelling
 2009, Earth Evocation
 2010, Pudana Last of the Line
 2012, 11 Images of a Human
 2015, Tsamo
 2017, Pyhä'' (credited as Anastasia Lapsuy)

See also
 List of Amanda Award winners
 List of Finnish submissions for the Academy Award for Best Foreign Language Film
 List of Inti Films films
 List of Jussi Award winners for Best Finnish Film
 List of submissions to the 73rd Academy Awards for Best Foreign Language Film

References

External links

1944 births
Living people
Russian film directors
Women radio journalists
21st-century Russian women writers
People from Yamalo-Nenets Autonomous Okrug
Nenets people
Russian expatriates in Finland
21st-century Russian screenwriters